William Pound (died c. 1418), of Kingston upon Hull, Yorkshire, was an English politician. Pound was the son and heir of the MP, Adam Pound.

Career
Pound was Mayor of Kingston upon Hull in the periods 1395–96 and 1397–98.

He was a Member (MP) of the Parliament of England for Kingston upon Hull in February 1388 and 1399.

References

14th-century births
1418 deaths
English MPs February 1388
Politicians from Kingston upon Hull
Mayors of Kingston upon Hull
English MPs 1399